Immaculate Heart Academy (IHA) is an all-girls college preparatory private Roman Catholic high school located in Washington Township, in Bergen County, New Jersey, United States. 

The school colors are blue and white, and the school's athletes are known as the Blue Eagles.

Immaculate Heart Academy has been accredited by the Commission on Secondary Schools of the Middle States Association of Colleges and Schools since 1971. For the 1996–97 school year, Immaculate Heart Academy was recognized with the National Blue Ribbon Award of Excellence from the United States Department of Education, the highest honor that an American school can achieve.

As of the 2019–20 school year, the school had an enrollment of 684 students and 59.4 classroom teachers (on an FTE basis), for a student–teacher ratio of 11.5:1. The school's student body was 80.1% (548) White, 11.4% (78) Hispanic, 5.0% (34) Asian, 1.6% (11) two or more races, 1.3% (9) Black, 0.4% (3) American Indian/ Alaska Native and 0.1% (1) Native Hawaiian/ Pacific Islander. Students come to IHA from Bergen County, Essex County, Passaic County and Hudson County in New Jersey, and from Rockland County and Orange County in New York.

History
The school was founded in 1960 by the Sisters of St. Joseph of Peace as the first regional high school for girls in the Roman Catholic Archdiocese of Newark. From 1990 to 2008, administration shifted to the Apostles of the Sacred Heart of Jesus.

The school opened in 1960 with 180 students in ninth grade in an interim site at a church in Paramus, having received approval to build a Permanent facility on almost  in Washington Township that would accommodate a maximum enrollment of one thousand students.

The school celebrated its Golden Jubilee during the 2010–11 academic year. Throughout the year, IHA held events celebrating the history of the school, the successes of its alumnae and the tradition it passes on to its students of the present and the future.

Consultative Board
The Immaculate Heart Academy Consultative Board began its duties on July 1, 2009. In prior years, a Finance Committee had been established and was effectively providing financial advice and direction to the school.

Athletics
The Immaculate Heart Academy Blue Eagles play in the Big North Conference, a super conference that includes 40 public and private high schools in Northern New Jersey and operates under the supervision of the New Jersey State Interscholastic Athletic Association (NJSIAA). Before the realignment in 2010, IHA played as a member of the North Jersey Tri-County Conference, an interim conference created to facilitate the realignment. Until the NJSIAA's 2009 realignment, the school had participated in Division C of the Northern New Jersey Interscholastic League, which was made up of high schools located in Bergen County, Essex County and Passaic County, and was separated into three divisions based on NJSIAA size classification. With 1,062 students in grades 10-12, the school was classified by the NJSIAA for the 2019–20 school year as Non-Public A for most athletic competition purposes, which included schools with an enrollment of 381 to 1,454 students in that grade range (equivalent to Group IV for public schools).

Immaculate Heart Academy has a longstanding rivalry with Academy of the Holy Angels.

Softball
The softball team won the Non-Public A state title in 1993 (defeating runner-up Paul VI High School in the finals), 1994 (vs. St. John Vianney High School), 1995 (vs. Notre Dame High School), 1996 (vs. Bishop Ahr High School), 1999 (vs. Eustace Preparatory School), 2000 (vs. Bishop Ahr), 2003 (vs. St. John Vianney), 2009 (vs. Bishop Ahr), 2012 (vs. St. John Vianney), 2015 (vs. Pope John XXIII Regional High School), 2016 (vs. Donovan Catholic High School) and 2017 (vs. Donovan Catholic). The program's 12 state titles are the most of any school in the state.

The 1995 softball team finished the season with a 27-3 record after winning their third consecutive Parochial A title with a 4-2 win against Notre Dame in the tournament final. In 1999, the team won the Parochial A title and finished the season 31-1 after a 2-1 win in the championship game against Bishop Eustace, the team that had defeated IHA in the Parochial A finals the previous two seasons.

The 2000 team finished the season with a 28-3 record after winning the Parochial A state title with a 1-0 victory scored on a sacrifice fly in the seventh inning of the championship game against a Bishop Ahr team that came into the finals with a 17-game winning streak.

NJ.com / The Star-Ledger ranked Immaculate Heart as their number-one softball team in the state in 1999, 2000, 2009 and 2012.

A 1-0 win in twelve innings against two-time defending champion St. John Vianney gave the 2003 team the Parochial A title and a record of 23-6 for the season.

In 2016, the team finished the season with a 30-1 record after winning the Non-Public A state title with a 2-1 victory against Donovan Catholic in the championship game played at Kean University. The team earned recognition as the top-ranked team in the state on the inaugural "NJ.com Top 50".

The 2017 team won the Non-Public A state title with a victory against Donovan Catholic in the finals. In the inaugural softball Tournament of Champions, the team came into the tournament as the second seed and beat sixth-seed Cedar Grove High School by a score of 3-0 in the semifinals and won the first ToC title with a 5-4 victory in extra innings against Immaculate Conception High School of Lodi to finish the season with a record of 30-4. For the second straight year, Immaculate Heart was recognized as the number-one softball team in the state on the "NJ.com Top 50".

Swimming
The swimming team won the Division A state championship in 1994 and won the Non-Public A title in 1995-2005 and 2008-2020. The program's 24 state titles are the most of any school in New Jersey. The streaks of 13 consecutive titles from 2008 to 2020 and of 12 straight wins from 1994 to 2005 are the longest such streaks in the state.

The 2000 team finished the season with an 11-0 record after winning the program's seventh title in a row with a 114-56 win in the Parochial A final against Bishop Ahr High School (since renamed as St. Thomas Aquinas High School).

The 2011 team scored 386 1/2 points at the Bergen Meet of Champions to win its 12th straight County title by a 177-point margin. Later, the team, seeded #2 in the New Jersey Non-Public Group A Tournament, defeated Holy Spirit High School in the state quarterfinals 118-52, Red Bank Catholic in the state semi-finals 107-63 and top-seeded Bishop Eustace High School 108-62 in the finals to win its fourth straight, and a record 16th, state championship.

Tennis
The tennis team won the Non-Public A state championship in 1995 (defeating runner-up Notre Dame High School in the tournament's final round), 1996 (vs. Notre Dame), 2005 (vs. Holy Spirit High School), 2006 (vs. Red Bank Catholic High School), 2007 (vs. Holy Spirit) and 2008 (vs. Holy Spirit).

In 2006, the team won the Non-Public A title after defeating Red Bank Catholic 4-1 in the finals at Mercer County Park.

The 2008 team won the program's fourth consecutive Non-Public A title with a 3-2 win against Holy Spirit in the finals.

2003-08 academic years
In 2003, the IHA cross-country team was disqualified from the Northern New Jersey Interscholastic League (NNJIL) C championship for violating High School Federation Rules limiting the number of runners each team could enter in its varsity race to seven, while the coaches had entered nine runners into the race.

The 2004 basketball team won the North Parochial A state championship, defeating Paramus Catholic High School by 36-21 in the tournament final.

In 2005, the NJSIAA stripped the IHA basketball team of 22 of its victories and eliminated the team from the North Non-Public A girls basketball tournament for the use of an ineligible player. The athlete in question had played high school-level basketball at a New York State high school as an eighth grader, a practice that would allow the student to participate in all four years of high school sports in New York, but is not permitted in New Jersey.

In 2007, the soccer team won the Non-Public North Group A sectional championship with a 3-1 win over Morris Catholic High School in the tournament final, the team's first sectional title in four years.

2009-10 academic year
During the 2009-10 academic year, Immaculate Heart Academy won the Non-Public Group A state championship in soccer, swimming, winter track and volleyball, where the team also won the New Jersey State Tournament of Champions, gaining the title of best volleyball team in New Jersey by defeating Bridgewater-Raritan High School 25-14, 25-15 in the tournament final The Blue Eagles also won the Non-Public North A sectional titles in basketball (finishing 2nd overall in the state) and spring track (finishing 3rd overall.)

The IHA bowling team won the New Jersey Tri-County Conference championship and eventually finished 3rd overall in the state.

2010-11 academic year

The soccer team won its fourth straight Bergen County championship, only the second team in the county to win in four consecutive years. In the state tournament, the Blue Eagles defeated The Pingry School for the Non-Public Group A North sectional championship in double overtime by a score of 1-0. The team advanced shared the Non-Public Group A state title with Red Bank Catholic after a 1–1 tie, giving IHA a third straight state title. With this championship, the 2010-11 Blue Eagles Senior Class won 11 out of a possible 12 titles (County, Sectional and State) in their four-year career at IHA.

In volleyball, despite losing in the Bergen County tournament, the Blue Eagles won the Non-Public Group A state championship for the fourth straight year. The team defeated Union Catholic in the state tournament, the third straight year IHA defeated Union Catholic for the state crown. The team advanced to the Tournament of Champions, where they lost in the semifinal round to Ramapo High School.

The IHA basketball team finished the season with a 27-1 record (the most wins in school history), winning the championship at the Joe Poli Tournament and Bergen County Championship and earning the top spot in the final Bergen Record Top 25 poll.

By the end of the 2010-11 academic year, Blue Eagles squads were named by the Bergen Record as the North Jersey Team of the Year in Girls Soccer, Bowling, Basketball, and Softball, while The Star-Ledger named the IHA Swimming team the North Jersey Team of the Year.

Student-athletes have were named Athletes of the Year by The Record in Soccer, Basketball, Golf, and Track and Field, and by The Star-Ledger in Bowling. Both The Record and The Star-Ledger named IHA senior Danielle Romain as their Swimmer of the Year.

2011-12 academic year
In cross country, IHA won the Big North Conference United Division championship, finished third in the Bergen County Championships, third in the North Non-Public Group A sectional meet, and fifth in the Non-Public Group A state meet to champion Mount Saint Dominic Academy.

The soccer team finished the season 15-3-2 with losses to Ramapo High School in the BCWCA Girls' Soccer Championship semifinals, and to The Pingry School in the North Non-Public Group A sectional championship game.

In volleyball, IHA won the BCWCA Bergen County tournament by defeating Bogota High School and also won the Non-Public Group A state championship for the fifth straight year, defeating Union Catholic in the state tournament for the fourth consecutive time. The team later won the school's fourth Tournament of Champions title by defeating River Dell High School in the semifinals and Demarest High School in the championship round.

2016-17 academic year
The softball team won its third consecutive Non-Public A state championship with a 5-1 win in the final against Donovan Catholic High School. The team won the inaugural New Jersey State Interscholastic Athletic Association softball Tournament of Champions with a 7-6 win in extra innings against Immaculate Conception High School in the tournament final. The program has won the Non-Public A state championship in 1993-96, 1999, 2000, 2003, 2009, 2012 and 2015–2017; the 12 state championships and 19 appearances in tournament finals are the most of any school in the state.

The ShopRite Cup
Immaculate Heart Academy received the NJSIAA Group A ShopRite Cup for the 2007-08 athletics season, which is awarded annually to the school with the top athletics program in each statewide grouping. The school received this honor for the second consecutive year for its 2008-09 athletics season, and again for the 2009-10 season.

Notable alumnae

 Serena Bocchino (born 1960, class of 1978), artist working primarily in the realm of abstract painting.
 Katrina Bowden (born 1988), 30 Rock actress.
 Mary Jane Clark (born 1954), crime novel author and CBS journalist.
 Erin C. Conaton (born 1970), United States Under Secretary of Defense for Personnel and Readiness and 2010 Commencement Speaker.
 Chrissy Costanza (born 1995), singer-songwriter and lead vocalist for Against The Current.
 Gabriella Cuevas (born 1993), footballer who plays as a centre back for Finnish Kansallinen Liiga club Kuopion Palloseura and the Dominican Republic women's national team.
 Mary Beth Keane (born 1977), author of The Walking People.
 Bridget Anne Kelly (born 1972), former Deputy Chief of Staff to Governor of New Jersey Chris Christie.
 Alyssa Monks (born 1977, class of 1995), painter.
 Krysten Moore (born 1989), beauty pageant participant and founder of "S.H.I.N.E." (Students Helping Instill New Esteem).
 Sarah Pagano (born 1991), long-distance runner.
 Nia Reed (born 1996), professional volleyball player and member of United States women's national volleyball team.
 Tracey Wigfield (born 1983), Emmy Award-winning writer for 30 Rock.

References

External links
Immaculate Heart Academy website
Data for Immaculate Heart Academy, National Center for Education Statistics

1960 establishments in New Jersey
Anthony J. DePace buildings
Educational institutions established in 1960
Girls' schools in New Jersey
Middle States Commission on Secondary Schools
Private high schools in Bergen County, New Jersey
Roman Catholic Archdiocese of Newark
Catholic secondary schools in New Jersey
Sisters of Saint Joseph schools
Washington Township, Bergen County, New Jersey